Ogden Mills may refer to:

 Ogden Mills (financier) (1856–1929), American businessman, father of Ogden L. Mills
 Ogden L. Mills (1884–1937), American Secretary of the Treasury and Congressman